The 2006 World Club Challenge was a Rugby league match held on Friday, 3 February 2006, at Galpharm Stadium, Huddersfield, UK. The game was contested by Bradford Bulls and Wests Tigers.

Qualification

Bradford Bulls

Bradford Bulls qualified for the Challenge after being crowned the 2005 Super League champions, defeating their local rivals Leeds Rhinos 15–6 at Old Trafford. This Grand Final win avenged a defeat to the same team in the title decider the year before.

Wests Tigers

Wests Tigers clinched the 2005 National Rugby League title in a 30–16 defeat of North Queensland Cowboys to earn a place in the World Club Challenge. The Tigers had reached the Grand Final for the first time since their formation five years earlier following a merger of Balmain Tigers and Western Suburbs.

Teams
The Tigers were without six of their 2005 NRL grand final-winning team: star stand-off half back Benji Marshall had undergone shoulder surgery in the off season; winger Pat Richards and forward Mark O'Neill had signed to play with other clubs, and Dene Halatau, Todd Payten and Shane Elford were also absent.

Match details

Man of the Match 

Stuart Fielden of the Bradford Bulls was awarded man of the match.

External links
2006 World club Challenge at bradfordbulls.co.uk
2006 World Club Challenge at superleague.co.uk
2006 World Club Challenge at rugbyleagueproject.com

World Club Challenge
Bradford Bulls matches
Wests Tigers matches
World Club Challenge
World Club Challenge
World Club Challenge